The 35th New Zealand Parliament was a term of the New Zealand Parliament. It was elected at the 1966 general election on 26 November of that year.

1966 general election

The 1966 general election was held on Saturday, 26 November.

Sessions
The 35th Parliament sat for three sessions, and was prorogued on 24 October 1969.

Ministries
The second National Government remained in place until its defeat at the  towards the end of that year.

Overview of seats
The table below shows the number of MPs in each party following the 1966 election and at dissolution:

Notes
The Working Government majority is calculated as all Government MPs less all other parties.

Initial composition of the 35th Parliament

By-elections during 35th Parliament
There were a number of changes during the term of the 35th Parliament.

Notes

References

35